The Turgay ([torɣai] "Tour-GUY") (also known as Torgai, Torghay or Turgai; , Romanised: Torğai;  Romanised: Turgay) is a river in Kazakhstan.

The Naurzum Nature Reserve is a protected area located in the river basin.

Course
The river originates at the confluence of the Zhaldama and Kara-Turgai rivers, which have their sources in the Kazakh Uplands. It  then flows along the Turgay Depression. The Turgay disappears in the endorheic basin of Shalkarteniz.

The Ubagan, a tributary of the Tobol, drains the valley to the north, the Turgay to the south. There are many shallow, often salty lakes in the valley. In the summer it dries up and its water becomes salty in the lower reaches of certain sections. The river is mostly fed by snow. It freezes in November and thaws in April.

Tributaries

See also
List of rivers of Kazakhstan
Lakes of the lower Turgay and Irgiz

References

Rivers of Kazakhstan
Shalkarteniz basin